Fara Gera d'Adda is a comune (municipality) in the Province of Bergamo in the Italian region of Lombardy, located about  northeast of Milan and about  southwest of Bergamo. 

Fara Gera d'Adda borders the following municipalities: Canonica d'Adda, Cassano d'Adda, Pontirolo Nuovo, Treviglio, Vaprio d'Adda.

References